Javier Mabrey is an American politician. He serves as a Democratic member for the 1st district of the Colorado House of Representatives.

Life and career 
Mabrey attended the University of Colorado Boulder and the University of California, Berkeley.

In 2022, Mabrey defeated Guillermo Diaz and Kyle Furey in the general election for the 1st district of the Colorado House of Representatives, winning 64 percent of the votes. He assumed office in 2023.

References 

Living people
Year of birth missing (living people)
Place of birth missing (living people)
Democratic Party members of the Colorado House of Representatives
21st-century American politicians
University of Colorado Boulder alumni
University of California, Berkeley alumni